Sarah Mlynowski (born January 4, 1977) is a Canadian writer of middle-grade fiction, young adult novels, and adult fiction. She lives in New York City.

Biography
Sarah Mlynowski is the daughter of the romance writer Elissa Ambrose. Her parents are divorced, and she has one sister, Aviva Mlynowski, and an older stepsister. 
She graduated with an Honors degree in English literature from McGill University. Later, she moved to Toronto to work for Harlequin Enterprises Ltd. She used her romance publishing experiences to fuel her first novel Milkrun, which has since been published in 16 countries, selling over 600,000 copies around the globe. After her second novel Fishbowl was published, she moved to New York City to write full-time. She is best known for her New York Times best-selling series Whatever After. Along with authors Michael Buckley, Julia DeVillers, and Adele Griffin, Mlynowski is a co-founder of OMG BookFest, a book festival geared to middle grade readers.

Mlynowski married her husband Todd in 2004, and together they have two daughters, Chloe and Anabelle.

Bibliography

Adult fiction 

Milkrun (2001)
Fishbowl (2002)
As Seen on TV (2003)
Monkey Business (2004)
Me Vs. Me (2006)

Non-fiction  

 See Jane Write (2006) (with Farrin Jacobs)

Young adult  
 Magic in Manhattan series 
 Bras & Broomsticks (2005)
 Frogs & French Kisses (2006)
 Spells & Sleeping Bags (2007)
 Parties & Potions (2008)
How to Be Bad (2008) (with E. Lockhart and Lauren Myracle)
Gimme a Call (2010)
Ten Things We Did (and Probably Shouldn't Have) (2011)
Don't Even Think About It (2014)
Think Twice (Don't Even Think About It, Book #2) (2016)
I See London, I See France (2017)

Middle grade  

 Whatever After series
 Fairest of All (2012)
 If the Shoe Fits (2012)
 Sink or Swim (2013)
 Dream On (2013)
 Bad Hair Day (2014)
 Cold As Ice (2014)
 Beauty Queen (2015)
 Once Upon a Frog (2015)
 Genie in a Bottle (2016)
 Sugar and Spice (2016)
 Abby in Wonderland (2017)
 Two Peas in a Pod (2018)
 Seeing Red (2018) 
 Spill the Beans (2019)
 Abby in Oz (2020)
 Good As Gold (2021)
 Just Dance (2022)

 Upside-Down Magic series (with Emily Jenkins and Lauren Myracle)
 Upside-Down Magic (2015)
 Upside-Down Magic: Sticks & Stones (2016)
 Upside-Down Magic: Showing Off (2017)
 Upside-Down Magic: Dragon Overnight (2018)
 Upside-Down Magic: Weather of Not (2019)
 Upside-Down Magic: The Big Shrink (2019)
Upside-Down Magic: Hide and Seek (2020)
Upside-Down Magic: Night Owl (2021)

 The Legends of Greemulax (2019) (with Kimmy Schmidt)

References

External links 

 
  (2001–2014)

1977 births
Canadian fantasy writers
Canadian romantic fiction writers
Canadian writers of young adult literature
Canadian women novelists
Living people
McGill University alumni
Women science fiction and fantasy writers
Women romantic fiction writers
Women writers of young adult literature
Writers from Montreal